The Philippines is divided into three (3) major island groups of Luzon, the Visayas, and Mindanao. Luzon and Mindanao are both named after the largest island in their respective groups, while the Visayas (also referred to as the Visayan Islands) is an archipelago.

Administrative divisions 
The islands of the Philippines are organized into three distinct island groups according to regions:

Luzon comprises 8 Regions: I to III, IV-A, V, NCR, CAR and Mimaropa.

Visayas comprises 3 Regions: VI to VIII.

Mindanao comprises 6 Regions: IX to XIII and BARMM.

If a province is reassigned into a new region, it may also be reassigned to a new island group, as is the case with Palawan, when it was temporarily assigned from Mimaropa to Western Visayas and thus temporarily was considered part of the Visayas.

The island groups themselves do not have governments of their own, but are instead divided into provinces, cities, municipalities and barangays, which do have their own local governments. The island groups are used for statistical convenience and in some cases, there are national government agencies that have created positions that cover the island groups such as the Assistant Secretary for Regional Operations in Mindanao in the Department of Public Works and Highways (DPWH) or the Assistant Secretary for Luzon Affairs in the Department of Social Welfare and Development (DSWD).

Although the island groups do not have local governments, hence capitals, certain cities have become the political, economic and cultural centers of the island groups. Manila is the national capital and is the de facto capital of Luzon, though neighboring Quezon City, a former capital, has more inhabitants than Manila. Cebu, on the province and island of the same name, is the chief city of the Visayas. Mindanao's main city is Davao, towards its southeast.

Islands

See also
Luzviminda
List of Islands of the Philippines
Geography of the Philippines

References

External links 
 

 
 
01
Subdivisions of the Philippines